Jukka Virtanen is the name of:

Jukka Virtanen (ice hockey), Finnish ice hockey player
Jukka Virtanen (director), Finnish film director and television host